Jim Rathmann (July 16, 1928 – November 23, 2011), born Royal Richard Rathmann, was an American race car driver who won the Indianapolis 500 in 1960.

He drove in the AAA and USAC Championship Car series in the 1949–1950 and 1952–1963 seasons with 42 starts, including the Indianapolis 500 in each of those seasons.  Rathmann also participated in the two runnings of the Race of Two Worlds at Monza, Italy, winning the 1958 event.  He had 6 victories in addition to his Indy 500 win.  He also drove in 3 races in the NASCAR series from 1949 to 1951.

Rathmann and his older brother swapped names while teenagers. As a 16-year-old going by the name of "Dick Rathmann," he wanted to start racing. To enter races, he borrowed his older brother's I.D. and assumed the identity of "Jim Rathmann." The name change stuck for life in public circles.

On August 15, 2007, Rathmann was inducted into the Motorsports Hall of Fame of America. The ceremony took place in Detroit. He died in 2011 after a seizure.

NASCAR career
Rathmann drove in 3 NASCAR Strictly Stock/Grand National races from 1949 to 1951, competing in one race in each of those years. He debuted in 1949 at Langhorne. Starting 13th in the race, Rathmann slid to 32nd by the end of the race. In 1950, Rathmann raced at the prestigious Daytona Beach Road Course. Starting 17th in this event, Rathmann finished a career-best 12th, two laps down. In his final race in 1951, Rathmann started a career-best 9th at Detroit. He finished 52nd in this race.

1960 Indianapolis 500 win
Started first row centered, Rathmann ran in the front the entire race. From the midway point on, Rathmann and fellow driver Rodger Ward were locked in a neck and neck duel for first. Tire wear became an issue as the race wore on and Rathmann was able to keep his wheels fresh long enough to outrace Ward to the finish. The race featured the most recorded lead changes in the "Indy 500" history.

Complete AAA/USAC Championship Car results

Indianapolis 500 results

Complete Formula One World Championship results
(key) (Races in italics indicate fastest lap)

World Championship career summary
The Indianapolis 500 was part of the FIA World Championship of Drivers each year from 1950 through 1960. Drivers competing at Indy during those years were credited with World Championship points and participation. Jim Rathmann participated in 10 World Championship races. He won 1 race, set 2 fastest lead laps, and finished on the podium 4 times. He accumulated a total of 29 championship points. This total is the largest number of World Championship points earned by a driver in the Indianapolis 500.

After racing

Rathmann later owned a Chevrolet-Cadillac dealership in Melbourne, Florida, where he befriended astronauts Alan Shepard, Gus Grissom, and Gordon Cooper. Rathmann convinced GM President Ed Cole to set up a program which supplied each astronaut with a pair of new cars each year. Most chose a family car for their wives and a Corvette for themselves. Alan Bean recalls Corvettes lined up in the parking lot outside the astronaut offices at the Johnson Space Center in Houston, and friendly races between Shepard and Grissom along the Florida beach roads.

After retiring from the car business, Rathmann lived with his wife, Mary Kay, in Indialantic, Florida.

Death
Over the decades after his victory, Rathmann was a regular visitor to the Indianapolis Motor Speedway during May each year. He drove the pace car several times. However, he missed the 100th-anniversary celebration in 2011 due to failing health. Rathmann died on November 23, 2011. He had reportedly suffered a seizure at his home days earlier and died at a hospice center in Melbourne, Florida.

References

External links
The Greatest 33

1928 births
2011 deaths
Indianapolis 500 drivers
Indianapolis 500 winners
American racing drivers
NASCAR drivers
People from Indialantic, Florida
Sportspeople from Alhambra, California
Racing drivers from California
Racing drivers from Los Angeles
World Sportscar Championship drivers
Formula One race winners
USAC Stock Car drivers
Carrera Panamericana drivers